The Jayne Estate Building, near the Delaware River waterfront in Old City Philadelphia, Pennsylvania, was built in 1870 to house eight stores by the estate of Dr. David Jayne (1799-1866), who became a millionaire by selling patent medicine.  The architect was John McArthur, Jr. who is best known as the designer of Philadelphia's City Hall.

The building was listed on the National Register of Historic Places in 1987. Plans fell through that year to develop the four-story warehouse into a hotel and the property was sold at auction.  The building was torn down soon afterward and the property is now the location of 1 Water St, a 17-story apartment building.  The Jayne Estate Building was the last example of the 19th-century commercial character of North Delaware Avenue (now, Columbus Boulevard), other such structures having been demolished due to the construction of Interstate 95 and other development.

The building was delisted by the National Register of Historic Places on January 18, 2011.

References

Commercial buildings on the National Register of Historic Places in Philadelphia
Commercial buildings completed in 1870
Former National Register of Historic Places in Pennsylvania
Demolished buildings and structures in Philadelphia